Hugo Lundkvist (17 May 1913 – 7 February 1998) was a Swedish sports shooter. He competed in the 50 m pistol event at the 1952 Summer Olympics.

References

External links
 

1913 births
1998 deaths
Swedish male sport shooters
Olympic shooters of Sweden
Shooters at the 1952 Summer Olympics
Sportspeople from Västra Götaland County
20th-century Swedish people